Wit Nyin Shite Than is a 2015 Burmese thriller television series. It is the first thriller television series in Myanmar. It aired on MRTV-4, from April 1 to June 2, 2015, on Mondays to Fridays at 19:15 for 45 episodes.

Cast

Main
 Aung Min Khant as Hein Htut Khaung
 Hsaung Wutyee May as Kyal Sin Cho
 Han Lin Thant as Nay Htut Khaung
 May Mi Kyaw Kyaw as Mabel
 Ei Si Kway as Shwe Min Myat
 Khin Sandar Myint as Suzan

Supporting
 Myat Thu Thu as Ei Shwe Sin
 Myat Kay Thi Aung as Kay Thi Soe
 Aung Khaing as U Shwe La Yaung
 War War Aung as Daw Saw Mon Gyi
 Su Hlaing Hnin as Htar Ei
 Zin Myo as Min Nay La
 Daung Wai as Lu Zaw
 Kyaw Htet as Ye Kyaw
 Zu Zu Zan

References

Burmese television series
MRTV (TV network) original programming